The Universitatea Titu Maiorescu is a private university in Bucharest, Romania, founded in 1991.

Universities in Bucharest
Educational institutions established in 1991
1991 establishments in Romania